Marjon is a given name which may refer to:

 MarJon Beauchamp (born 2000), American basketbal player
 Marjon Kamara (born 1949), Liberian diplomat and politician
 Marjon Lambriks (born 1949), Dutch soprano
 Marjon van Royen (born 1957), Dutch journalist
 Marjon Strijk, Dutch classical soprano
 Marjon Wijnsma (born 1965), Dutch retired heptathlete and long jumper

Feminine given names